The Andrew Carpenter House on State Road 1820 in Gaston County, North Carolina, is believed to have been built for Andrew Carpenter shortly after his marriage to Sophia Smith on April 19, 1831.  The two-story Federal style plantation house is two rooms deep and has paired chi mneys.  It is one of the largest early-19th century houses in Gaston County.

The house was accessioned to the National Register of Historic Places on March 17, 1983.  This referenced website has several excellent photographs of the house.

References

Plantation houses in North Carolina
Houses on the National Register of Historic Places in North Carolina
Federal architecture in North Carolina
Houses completed in 1831
Houses in Gaston County, North Carolina
National Register of Historic Places in Gaston County, North Carolina